Thomas Young (c. 1587–1655) was a Scottish Presbyterian minister and theologian, resident in England and a member of the Westminster Assembly. He was the major author of the Smectymnuus group of leading Puritan churchmen. He was also Master of Jesus College, Cambridge, and is known as the tutor to John Milton from the age of about ten.

Life
He was born in Perthshire, his father William Young being a vicar. He studied at St Andrews University, graduating M.A. in 1606. He then moved south to England.

In London, from before 1612, he worked as a teaching assistant to Thomas Gataker. He tutored Milton, possibly from 1618 to 1620 or 1622, and continued to correspond with him. He then took a position in Hamburg, as minister to English merchants there, returning to England in 1628 and becoming vicar at Stowmarket.

He was the primary author of the pamphlet An Answer signed Smectymnuus, an answer to an anonymous publication defending episcopacy and in fact written by Joseph Hall. It sparked off several more publications.

He became a Westminster Assembly member in 1643, and Master of Jesus College in 1644. He was expelled as Master in 1650.

Between 1628 and 1655 Young was vicar at the church of St Peter and St Mary in Stowmarket and his portrait hangs on the south wall of the church nave.

Works
Dies Dominica (1639)	
Hope's Incouragement pointed at (1644)
Smectymnuus Redivivus (1669)

References

1587 births
1655 deaths
Westminster Divines
Masters of Jesus College, Cambridge
Alumni of the University of St Andrews
Scottish Calvinist and Reformed theologians
17th-century Calvinist and Reformed theologians
17th-century Scottish writers